Acanthobrama hadiyahensis , also known as the Arabian bream, is a species of freshwater cyprinid fish, which has been described from  Wadi Hadiyah, Saudi Arabia. They face the same ecological threats as other freshwater fish from the region, mainly habitat loss and damming.

References

hadihadi
Fish described in 1983
Endemic fauna of Saudi Arabia